Alexander Vialevich Krevsun (June 2, 1980 — July 3, 2002) was a Kazakhstani professional ice hockey player.  He was drafted 124th overall by the Nashville Predators in the 1999 NHL Entry Draft.  He played one season for the organization, playing in the ECHL for the New Orleans Brass and one game in the American Hockey League for the Milwaukee Admirals before he was released and he returned to Russia, signing for CSK VVS Samara

Krevsun died on July 3, 2002 after suffering a brain hemorrhage during a cross-country preseason workout in Samara.

References

External links

1980 births
2002 deaths
Sportspeople from Karaganda
HC CSK VVS Samara players
HC Lada Togliatti players
Ice hockey players who died while playing
Krylya Sovetov Moscow players
Kazakhstani ice hockey forwards
Milwaukee Admirals (IHL) players
Nashville Predators draft picks
New Orleans Brass players
Kazakhstani expatriate sportspeople in the United States
Kazakhstani expatriate sportspeople in Russia
Kazakhstani expatriate ice hockey people
Expatriate ice hockey players in the United States
Expatriate ice hockey players in Russia